Redshift is an application that adjusts the computer display's color temperature based upon the time of day.  The program is free software, and is intended to reduce eye strain as well as insomnia (see Sleep#Circadian clock and Phase response curve#Light).

Redshift transitions the computer display's color temperature evenly between daytime and night temperatures to allow the user's eyes to slowly adapt. At night, the color temperature is low and is typically 3000–4000 K, preferably matching the room's lighting temperature. Typical color temperature during the daytime is 5500–6500 K.

Features 
Redshift is primarily distributed for and used on the Linux operating system.

Redshift can be used to set a single color temperature and brightness ("one shot mode") or can adjust the temperature and brightness continuously to follow the sun's elevation, in which case it will transition to the night color temperature settings near twilight. The temperature and brightness settings for daytime and night can be user-configured.

To determine the Sun's elevation the software requires the user's location in form of latitude and longitude.

On Linux and BSD operating systems, Redshift supports multiple monitors through the X extensions RandR (preferred) or VidMode, or through the Direct Rendering Manager. Because Redshift can only be configured to use the same gamma correction on all monitors it controls, it is usually desirable to run one instance of the program per monitor.

Interfaces 
Redshift originally possessed only a command-line interface, but now has graphical user interfaces (GUIs) that support most Linux desktop environments. Those GUIs include redshift-gtk, redshift-plasmoid, and nightshift.

redshift-gtk is included in Redshift's source tree. In addition to a windowed interface, it provides a tray status icon that can enable or disable Redshift or adjust the screen's color temperature automatically.

Redshift can be opened with the use of terminal, panel launchers or startup commands: the command 'redshift -O #TEMP' (#TEMP being a number from 1000 to 25000) will set the temperature and the command 'redshift -x' to exit Redshift.

A simple script can be made and called upon to set the colour temp manually via a shortcut or panel launcher:

 Create a new file and copy in the following:#!/bin/bash
shouldloop=true;
while $shouldloop; do
    read -p "What temp would you like? 1000-25000K: " scale

    if "$scale" -ge 1000 && "$scale" -le 25000; then
        redshift -O $scale
        shouldloop=false;
    elif $scale = "x"; then
        exit
    elif $scale = "X"; then
        exit
    else
        echo "Invalid value or outside range. x to exit..."
    fi
done
 Save the file in your /home/$user directory.
 Change the properties of the file so it can be executed (using chmod or context menu permissions).
 Create a new launcher ("set temp") referring to the file you have named above and select "Open in Terminal".
 Create a new launcher ("exit redshift") with the command redshift -x (no need to open this in terminal).
 Use the launcher to set temperature or exit Redshift.

Reviews 
Redshift has been positively reviewed by Linux users, who note that Redshift has some installation and user interface advantages compared to the f.lux Linux port xflux. However, f.lux's systems have since been updated to enhance its dimmed display.

Ubuntu MATE provides Redshift installed by default since their 17.10 release.

Linux Mint Cinnamon provides Redshift installed by default since their 18.3 release.

See also 
 F.lux
 Red Moon (software)
 Night Shift (software) – a feature of macOS and iOS that provides a similar function

References

External links 
 Project website on GitHub

2011 software
Free software
Ergonomics
Sleep